Sun Island may refer to:

 Sun Island, one of two main exhibition areas for the Harbin International Ice and Snow Sculpture Festival
 Usedom, a Baltic Sea island between Germany and Poland nicknamed "Sun Island"

See also
Island in the Sun (disambiguation)